Svea Placida Mariana Norén (5 October 1895 – 9 May 1985) was a Swedish figure skater. She won the silver medal in the ladies' singles event at the 1920 Summer Olympics behind fellow Swede Magda Julin. She qualified for the 1924 Games, but did not compete. Norén medaled at the World Figure Skating Championships several times. She won the bronze in 1913 and 1923, and the silver in 1922.

Results

References

Further reading

External links
World Figure Skating Championships ladies' results

1895 births
1985 deaths
Olympic figure skaters of Sweden
Figure skaters at the 1920 Summer Olympics
Swedish female single skaters
Olympic silver medalists for Sweden
Olympic medalists in figure skating
World Figure Skating Championships medalists
Medalists at the 1920 Summer Olympics
Sportspeople from Stockholm
20th-century Swedish women